Lopamudra Bhattacharji (born 31 January 1960) is a former Test and One Day International cricketer who represented Indian national team. She is a medium pace bowler and has played one Test and 15 ODIs.

References

1960 births
Bengal women cricketers
East Zone women cricketers
Living people
India women One Day International cricketers
India women Test cricketers
Indian women cricketers
University of Calcutta alumni